Sinora (Greek: Σύνορα; English: Borderland) is the title of the fifth studio album by the Greek artist Kostas Martakis, released on 28 March 2016 by Panik Platinum in Greece and Cyprus. It was certified Gold in Cyprus, and was awarded to Martakis on the Cypriot award show "Super Music Awards".

Track listing

Release history

Personnel
Kostas Martakis – executive producer
Maraddin – photography
Konstantinos Georgantas – artwork
Akis Deiximos – backing vocals
Katerina Kyriakou – backing vocals
Giannis Kifonidis – mixing
Kyriakos Asteriou – mixing

References

2016 albums
Kostas Martakis albums
Greek-language albums